Persoonia confertiflora, commonly known as cluster-flower geebung, is a species of flowering plant in the family Proteaceae and is endemic to south-eastern Australia. It is an erect to low-lying shrub with hairy young branches, egg-shaped to narrow elliptic leaves, and hairy yellow flowers borne on leaf axils or on the ends of short branches.

Description
The flowers are arranged in clusters in leaf axils or on the ends of branchlets that do not continue growth after flowering.

Taxonomy
Persoonia confertiflora was first formally described in 1870 by George Bentham in the fifth volume of Flora Australiensis.

Distribution and habitat
Cluster-flower geebung grows in woodland and forest south from near Mount Kosciuszko in New South Wales to eastern Victoria.

References

confertiflora
Flora of New South Wales
Flora of Victoria (Australia)
Taxa named by George Bentham
Plants described in 1870